EconLit is an academic literature abstracting database service published by the American Economic Association.  The service focuses on literature in the field of economics. EconLit covers articles and other materials dating back to 1969. It uses the JEL classification codes for classifying papers by subject.

See also
List of academic databases and search engines

References

External links

Bibliographic databases and indexes
Economic databases